Eirikur Bergmann (Eiríkur Bergmann Einarsson) (born 6 February 1969) is an Icelandic academic and writer. He is author of nine academic books and three novels.

Early life and education 
Eirikur Bergmann was born in Reykjavík in 1969 and studied political science at the University of Iceland and Copenhagen University.

Academics 
Eirikur Bergmann is Professor of Politics and Director of the Centre for European Studies at Bifröst University. He was awarded Cand.Sci.Pol degree from Copenhagen University in 1998 and Ph.D. in Political Science from University of Iceland in 2009. Bergmann has been a visiting fellow at many academic institutions, including Visiting Professor in the Faculty of Social Science at the University of Ljubljana in Slovenia.

Bergmann is mainly known for his analysis of Nativist Populism, which he argues has turned into a distinctive form of Neo-nationalism in the post-Second World War era. He has also researched Conspiracy Theories, European Integration and Iceland's political economy, especially in relations to the Crash of 2008, its prelude and aftermath.

Columnist 

Eirikur Bergmann is also an active columnist. He has written for many newspapers in Iceland and for the British The Guardian.

Constitutional Council 

Bergmann was elected in 2010 to Iceland's Constitutional Assembly and subsequently served in 2011 as one of the 25 members of the Constitutional Council, part of the 2010–2013 reform of Iceland's constitution.

References

External links 
 Official website

University of Iceland alumni
University of Copenhagen alumni
Eirikur Bergmann
1969 births
Living people
Eirikur Bergmann
Eirikur Bergmann